Joachim II may refer to:

 Joachim II Hector, Elector of Brandenburg  (1505–1571)
 Patriarch Joachim II of Constantinople (R. from 1860 to 1863 and from 1873 to 1878)